Au Pair Girls is a 1972 British sex comedy film directed by Val Guest. It stars Gabrielle Drake, Astrid Frank, Me Me Lai and Nancie Wait. Part of the British 1970s softcore sex comedy genre, the film also includes appearances by mainstream actors Trevor Bannister, Richard O'Sullivan, John Le Mesurier, Ferdy Mayne, Geoffrey Bayldon and Johnny Briggs.

A sequel, Glamour Incorporated, was also to have been directed by Guest but was never produced.

Plot
Four young female au pairs are seen arriving at Heathrow Airport. They are then taken to the offices of the Overseas Employment Agency in London, which has arranged placements for them.

Anita Sector is assigned to Mr and Mrs Howard. She does not prove popular with Mr Howard as she manages to flood the house while taking a shower and then disappears on a date with Malcolm, a man who preyed on her at the airport. They visit a casino where Anita meets Sheik El Abab and disappears with him after Malcolm loses money at the roulette table. When she is taken to the sheik's home, she spends time with his concubines and discovers that he is a very wealthy philanthropist. When the sheik tries to seduce Anita, she realises that her deadline for returning to the Howards' house has passed. She reaches the house to find her suitcases on the doorstep.

Randi Lindstrom is assigned to the family of businessman Mr Wainwright. She is picked up by his son Stephen, who is immediately attracted to her. After a series of mishaps, Stephen and Randi end up back at Mr Wainwright's offices and have sex in the car, where they are found naked by a shocked Mr Wainwright the next morning.

Nan Lee is assigned to Lord and Lady Tryke as a playmate for their son Rupert, who is being groomed as a concert pianist. Rupert's exposure to the outside world has been limited to trips out in the car and he is immature for his age due to a lack of appropriate interaction with other young people. Nan plays along with Rupert's children's games in the garden and after dinner. Later, she reflects on Rupert's immaturity but realises that she has enjoyed her time with him. She seduces him and quietly leaves the next morning.

Christina Geisler is assigned to the Fairfax family. Learning that Christina is a virgin, their daughter Carol decides to take her along to see pop star Ricky Strange. Carol and Christina go shopping to buy a more revealing outfit that will help Christina to arouse Ricky. Christina meets Ricky after his performance and ends up having sex with him, quickly followed by Carol's boyfriend Buster, but this is all revealed to have been a ruse by Carol to enable her to have sex with Ricky. After Christina realises that she has been used, she confides in Buster, who is understanding despite his boorish personality. Next morning, she tells Carol that she is leaving and terminates her employment with the Fairfaxes.

Randi, Nan and Christina end up back at the agency. Anita arrives and asks them if they want to join her as new concubines for the sheik. They immediately accept, and all four au pairs get into the sheik's car and are driven away.

Cast

Gabrielle Drake as Randi Lindstrom
Astrid Frank as Anita Sector
Me Me Lay as Nan Lee
Nancie Wait as Christina Geisler
Richard O'Sullivan as Stephen Wainwright

John Le Mesurier as Mr Wainwright
Ferdy Mayne as Sheik El Abab
John Standing as Buster
Steve Patterson as Ricky Strange
Julian Barnes as Rupert Tryke

Rosalie Crutchley as Lady Tryke
Geoffrey Bayldon as Mr Howard
Daphne Anderson as Mrs Howard
Trevor Bannister as Photographer
Johnny Briggs as Malcolm

Harold Bennett as Lord Tryke
Roger Avon as Rathbone
Joyce Heron as Mrs Stevenson
Marianne Stone as Mrs Fairfax
Lyn Yeldham as Carol Fairfax

Production

Au Pair Girls was director Val Guest's first sex comedy. Unfamiliar with the genre, he decided to view a number of foreign sex comedies in preparation, turning to ex-BBFC censor John Trevelyan for suggestions. The original script was adapted from a story by pornographic film producer David Grant. Guest disliked its explicit sexual content and made numerous revisions before agreeing to film it.

Principal photography began in January 1972. Shooting locations were based in and around London. The opening scenes were filmed at Heathrow Airport, with Mr Wainwright's office represented by Euston Tower and the Tryke family home by Oakley Court in Bray, Berkshire. Most of the scenes featuring Nan Lee (Me Me Lay) were filmed at Friar Park, George Harrison's mansion in Henley-on-Thames, Oxfordshire.

Release and reception
The film was released in September 1972.

In a contemporary review, Derek Elley of The Monthly Film Bulletin was critical of the film: "Val Guest hits rock bottom with this humourless attempt at a sex comedy ... Gabrielle Drake and Astrid Frank just manage to keep the film moving, but as the national jokes pile relentlessly on top of one another, the principal diversion becomes the spotting of familiar British faces in the unlikeliest of roles."

Commentator Simon Sheridan describes the film as a "funky, swinging feast of fun". He adds that while many sex comedies of the 1960s and 70s stereotyped female au pairs as "sexually provocative sexpots", Au Pair Girls was the first British film to cast them as the main characters.

Brian Davidson of Cinema Retro magazine writes that the film's "chauvinistic treatment of women" would make it objectionable to many modern audiences. He also argues that while the film is ostensibly a comedy, "at least half of its running time has little to do with humour. While on the one hand it is a celebration of the liberal sexual attitudes of the time ... on the other, it ultimately condemns those same attitudes." He considers the film unusual for the genre in its portrayal of Christa (Nancie Wait), whose unhappy story "forces us to reconsider our response to everything that has gone before."

Guest rejected claims that the film is pornographic, instead calling it "art". In an interview with Cinema X magazine, he described the film's depiction of sex as "all fun; it's bubble. There is absolutely no violence or kinks. There are no lesbians, no queers and no whips; nothing like that at all." In his autobiography, he distanced himself from Au Pair Girls and his later sex comedy Confessions of a Window Cleaner, stating that he preferred to be remembered for his earlier work.

Nancie Wait 
Nancy Wait was born in Chicago in 1949, grew up in New York City, studied acting at the High School of Performing Arts, attended Carnegie-Mellon for two years in theater, moved to London and attended Royal Academy of Dramatic Arts, worked at the Playboy Club during term breaks. Wait, as "Nancie Wait" appeared in "Au Pair Girls". She returned from London, and became a painter and writer. Her memoir "The Nancy Who Drew" was published in 2011.

References

External links

1970s sex comedy films
1972 films
Au pairs in films
British sex comedy films
1970s English-language films
Films directed by Val Guest
Films set in London
Films shot in Berkshire
Films shot in London
Films shot in Oxfordshire
1972 comedy films
1970s British films